Hillson may refer to:

Surname
Bobby Hillson, London-based fashion illustrator, founder of the Central Saint Martins MA Fashion course
Jack Hillson, Canadian provincial politician

Given name
Hillson Beasley (1855–1936), English-trained architect

Aircraft
Hillson Bi-mono, British experimental aircraft of the 1940s
Hillson F.H.40 (Slip-wing Hurricane), British single-seat fighter aircraft
Hillson Helvellyn, 1940s British two-seat training monoplane
Hillson Pennine, 1930s United Kingdom two-seat cabin monoplane
Hillson Praga or Praga E.114, single-engine sport airplane

See also
Hillsong (disambiguation)